Wendy Cracked a Walnut (also known as ...Almost) is a 1990 Australian romantic fantasy/comedy film directed by Michael Pattinson and starring Rosanna Arquette and Bruce Spence.

Plot
Wendy is unhappy with her life and with her preoccupied husband, Ronnie. She reads Mills and Boon romantic novels and dreams of a new life  featuring a dream lover, Jake.

Cast
 Rosanna Arquette as Wendy
 Bruce Spence as Ronnie
 Hugo Weaving as Jake
 Kerry Walker as Deidre
 Doreen Warburton as Elsie
 Desiree Smith as Cynthia
 Susan Lyons as Caroline
 Betty Lucas as Mrs. Taggart
 Dennis Hoey as Sonny Taggart
 Douglas Hedge as Mr. Leveredge
 Barry Jenkins as Pierre

Production
It was the first theatrical film from the Australian Broadcasting Corporation.

Reception
The film wasn't well received critically or commercially. David Stratton of Variety called it "limply executed" and "unconvincing".  It grossed only A$43,074 in Australia.

It was released in the U.S. direct-to-video under the title ...Almost.

References

External links

Wendy Cracked a Walnut at Oz Movies

Australian romantic comedy films
1990 films
Films scored by Bruce Smeaton
1990s English-language films
1990s Australian films